Jordan Horton Lyles (born October 19, 1990) is an American professional baseball pitcher for the Kansas City Royals of Major League Baseball (MLB). He has previously played in MLB for the Houston Astros, Colorado Rockies, San Diego Padres, Pittsburgh Pirates, Milwaukee Brewers, Texas Rangers, and Baltimore Orioles.

High school
Lyles attended Hartsville High School in Hartsville, South Carolina. In his junior baseball season, he led the Red Foxes to a 4A championship, compiling a 6–1 win–loss record and a 0.85 earned run average (ERA). He went 7–2 in 2008, recording a 1.86 ERA and 89 strikeouts in  innings pitched. As a hitter, Lyles hit .447 with six home runs and 20 runs batted in. In football, Lyles set single-season school records with 81 receptions for 1,568 yards and 23 touchdowns.

Professional career

Houston Astros
The Houston Astros selected Lyles with the 38th pick in the 2008 Major League Baseball draft. After signing, Lyles pitched in the Rookie-level Appalachian League, where he recorded 64 strikeouts in  innings. In 2010, Baseball America named Lyles the Astros' top pitching prospect. That season, he appeared in the All-Star Futures Game.

Lyles had his contract purchased by Houston on May 28, 2011. His first start with the Houston Astros came at Wrigley Field on May 31. He pitched 7+ innings and allowed one earned run in a 7–3 win. He also got his first career hit. Lyles recorded his first major league win August 3, 2011, against the Cincinnati Reds. In the 2011 season with Houston, he was 2–8 with a 5.36 ERA.

The Astros optioned Lyles to Oklahoma City at the start of the 2012 season. On April 29, Lyles was recalled to Houston to make a start for Kyle Weiland, who was placed on the 15-day DL. Lyles was 4–0 with a 3.46 ERA with 24 strikeouts in 26 innings at Oklahoma City. Lyles gave up three runs over six innings of work. Though he left with the lead, the bullpen lost control, and the Astros lost, 6–5. After the game, Lyles was optioned back to Triple-A to make room for Marwin González, who was activated from paternity leave. In the 2012 season with Houston, he was 5–12 with a 5.09 ERA.

In the 2013 season with the Astros, he was 7–9 with a 5.59 ERA. In AAA with Oklahoma City, he was 2–2 with a 5.32 ERA.

Colorado Rockies
On December 3, 2013, Lyles, along with outfielder Brandon Barnes, was traded to the Colorado Rockies for outfielder Dexter Fowler and a player to be named later. In 22 starts, Lyles tied a career high with 7 wins and posted his lowest ERA of his career with a 4.33 in 126.2 innings.

On January 14, 2015, Lyles and the Rockies avoided arbitration, agreeing to a one-year contract worth $2.475 million. On June 1, Jordan was placed on the 15-day disabled list with a medial collateral ligament injury in his left big toe. On June 3, it was declared Lyles would need left big toe surgery, ending his season after just 10 starts. In 2015 with the Rockies, he was 2–5	with a 5.14 ERA.

In 2016, Lyles began as a starter but after five starts, he was shifted to the bullpen for the remainder of the season. For the 2016 season, Lyles posted a record of 4–5 with a 5.83 ERA in 40 games. In AAA with Albuquerque he was 4–2 with a 5.44 ERA.

The following season in 2017, Lyles was used mainly out of the bullpen to disastrous results, as he posted an 0–2 record with an ERA of 6.94 in 33 games. He was designated for assignment and released by the Rockies on August 1.

San Diego Padres
Lyles signed a minor league deal with the San Diego Padres on August 8, 2017. The Padres used Lyles as a starter for the final month of the season, in which he posted a 1–3 record with an ERA of 9.39.

On November 2, 2017, he was granted free agency. On December 17, 2017, the Padres signed Lyles to a one-year, $1 million contract to remain with the team. On May 15, 2018, Lyles threw 7 perfect innings against the Colorado Rockies at home before allowing a hit in the eighth. Lyles split time between the bullpen and the rotation, appearing in 24 games while making 8 starts. He pitched to a 4.29 ERA in  innings.

Milwaukee Brewers
On August 5, 2018, the Milwaukee Brewers claimed Lyles from the Padres off of trade waivers. In 11 games, Lyles posted a 3.31 ERA in  innings.

Pittsburgh Pirates
On December 17, 2018, Lyles signed a one-year, $2.05 million contract with the Pittsburgh Pirates for the 2019 season.

Milwaukee Brewers (second stint)
After pitching to a 5–7 record and a 5.36 ERA with the Pirates, Lyles was traded back to the Brewers for Cody Ponce on July 29. He finished the season going 7–1 with a 2.45 ERA over  innings for the Brewers.

Texas Rangers
On December 13, 2019, Lyles signed a two-year contract with the Texas Rangers worth $16 million. In 2020 he went 1–6 with a 7.02 ERA. He tied for the AL lead in earned runs allowed, with 45. Lyles posted a 10–13 record with a 5.15 ERA and 146 strikeouts over 180 innings in 2021. He led the majors with 38 home runs allowed.

Baltimore Orioles
Lyles signed a one-year, $5.5 million contract with the Baltimore Orioles on March 12, 2022. In 2022, he was 12-11 with a 4.42 ERA over a career high 32 starts covering 179 innings. He led a resurgent Orioles pitching staff in innings pitched, strikeouts, and wins. On November 9, 2022, Lyles option was declined by the Baltimore Orioles making him a free agent.

Kansas City Royals
On December 28, 2022, Lyles signed a two-year contract with the Kansas City Royals worth $17 million.

References

External links

Baseball Almanac

1990 births
Living people
People from Hartsville, South Carolina
Baseball players from South Carolina
Major League Baseball pitchers
Houston Astros players
Colorado Rockies players
San Diego Padres players
Milwaukee Brewers players
Pittsburgh Pirates players
Texas Rangers players
Baltimore Orioles players
Greeneville Astros players
Tri-City ValleyCats players
Lexington Legends players
Corpus Christi Hooks players
Round Rock Express players
Oklahoma City RedHawks players
Modesto Nuts players
Colorado Springs Sky Sox players
Albuquerque Isotopes players
El Paso Chihuahuas players
Indianapolis Indians players